Hotel is an American primetime soap opera series which aired on ABC from September 21, 1983, to May 5, 1988, in the timeslot following Dynasty.

Based on Arthur Hailey's 1965 novel of the same name (which had also inspired a 1967 feature film), the series was produced by Aaron Spelling and set in the elegant and fictitious St. Gregory Hotel in San Francisco (changed from the New Orleans setting of the novel and film). Establishing shots of the hotel were filmed in front of the Fairmont San Francisco atop the Nob Hill neighborhood. Episodes followed the activities of passing guests, as well as the personal and professional lives of the hotel staff.

The distribution rights to the series were originally owned by Warner Bros. Pictures Distribution, until 2006 when CBS Paramount Network Television bought the television libraries and properties of Spelling Entertainment Inc. from Paramount Pictures Domestic Distribution and Viacom Enterprises.

Premise
Rich aristocrat Victoria Cabot (Anne Baxter) runs the St. Gregory Hotel, assisted by general manager Peter McDermott (James Brolin) and his staff. McDermott and assistant general manager Christine Francis (Connie Sellecca) became romantically involved. Halfway through the series Cabot died, leaving McDermott her share of the St. Gregory Hotel. When McDermott inherited half of the St. Gregory, he ran the hotel and promoted Francis to general manager.

Other staff members included: the guest relations director Mark Danning (Shea Farrell); ex-conman now head of hotel security, Billy Griffin (Nathan Cook); reception manager Julie Gillette (Shari Belafonte); young couple Dave and Megan Kendall (real life spouses Michael Spound and Heidi Bohay), a bellhop and a desk clerk, respectively; and Harry the bartender (Harry George Phillips). Characters Eric Lloyd (Ty Miller); Cheryl Dolan (Valerie Landsburg) and Ryan Thomas (Susan Walters) were added to the cast during its final season.

Cast members Brolin, Sellecca, Belafonte and Cook appeared in every episode of the series. In later years, Efrem Zimbalist Jr., made numerous guest appearances as an opponent of Victoria Cabot and Peter McDermott who plants his daughter, played by Michelle Phillips, in the hotel staff as the concierge.

Bette Davis appeared in the pilot episode as hotel owner Laura Trent, and publicity for the series indicated that Davis was to be a regular on the program. However, the onset of ill health forced Davis to withdraw from the series and Anne Baxter, who had played her nemesis in the 1950 film All About Eve, was brought in as Victoria Cabot, Mrs. Trent's sister-in-law. When Davis' health improved it was intended to bring her back; however, with Baxter on board fulfilling the series matriarchal role it was decided to make Davis' character an offscreen character, who though mentioned, was never seen. Coincidentally, Davis would outlive Baxter by four years and the series itself by over a year.

Similar to Spelling's other ABC show, The Love Boat, episodes of Hotel relied heavily on the appearance of recognizable guest stars. However, unlike The Love Boat's comedic story lines, Hotel generally broached more serious and controversial subject matter, such as abortion, infidelity, rape, suicide, AIDS, homophobia, spousal abuse and child molestation.

Guest stars

Ian Abercrombie
David Ackroyd 5/13
Deborah Adair 2/3, 3/6, 4/1, 5/4
Maud Adams  3/13
Neile Adams  
Claude Akins  2/11, 3/6
Eddie Albert  3/4
Frank Aletter  
Denise Alexander  1/23
Ana Alicia
Chad Allen
Steve Allen
Bridgette Andersen
Carl Anderson 3/20
Melissa Sue Anderson 1/23, 3/3
Melody Anderson  3/19
Susan Anton 
Army Archerd
Mackenzie Astin  2/12, 3/9
Christopher Atkins  3/7
Brian Avery  
Leah Ayres  
Lew Ayres   1/22
Barbara Babcock  2/10
Jane Badler  3/8
Vincent Baggetta  2/12
Scott Baio    1/9
Rebecca Balding
Alec Baldwin
Martin Balsam  4/18
Adrienne Barbeau  1/15, 4/10
Priscilla Barnes  2/8, 5/2
Douglas Barr  3/5
Gene Barry  5/3
Ivor Barry
Bonnie Bartlett
Jaime Lyn Bauer
Barbara Baxley  2/6
Amanda Bearse
Jenny Beck
John Beck  4/10
Ralph Bellamy  3/8, 4/1, 4/2
Dirk Benedict  5/10
Polly Bergen
Shelley Berman
Jason Bernard
Theodore Bikel  2/12
Tony Bill  2/1
Susan Blakely  3/16, 4/19
Ronee Blakley  5/12
Lloyd Bochner  1/1, 3/2, 5/13
Earl Boen
Heidi Bohay  5/11
Tom Bosley  3/14, 4/16
Barbara Bosson  5/15
Pamela Bowman
William Boyett
Danielle Brisebois  1/14
Morgan Brittany  1/21, 4/2
Ellen Bry  3/23
Lee Bryant
Delta Burke  4/9
Paul Burke  1/6, 4/2
Timothy Busfield  3/3
Dean Butler  4/22
Jean Byron
Jeffrey Byron
Brandon Call
John Callahan
Joseph Campanella
Billy Campbell
Katherine Cannon  1/19
Diana Canova  1/7
Paul Carafotes
Karen Carlson  5/5
Peggy Cass  1/4
Maxwell Caulfield  4/11
Dick Cavett  2/5
Paul Cavonis
Lonny Chapman  1/22
Doran Clark  3/14
George Clooney  3/13
Philip Coccioletti  1/15
 Scott Coffey  3/17
Gary Collins  1/13
Anjanette Comer  5/2
Jeff Conaway  4/17
Didi Conn
William Conrad  3/10, 3/11
Michael Constantine   1/9
Frank Converse  3/21
Bert Convy  2/3, 4/3
Alex Cord  2/2
Lydia Cornell  1/23, 3/15
Aneta Corsaut
Cathy Lee Crosby  1/7, 4/15, 4/16
Mary Crosby  1/18, 3/6
Scatman Crothers  1/8
Patricia Crowley
Melinda Culea   2/5
Robert Culp  3/14, 4/19
Jon Cypher  3/19
Abby Dalton  1/8, 5/9
Stuart Damon  3/7
Cesare Danova
Kim Darby  2/7
John Davidson  1/10, 2/6
Phyllis Davis  1/17
Bruce Davison  2/11
Laraine Day  3/5
Rosemary DeCamp
Kim Delaney  4/7
Johnny Depp  4/15
Robert Desiderio
Bradford Dillman  1/21
Elinor Donahue  1/10
Juliana Donald  5/13
James Doohan 2/4
Sarah Douglas  3/21
Peter Duchin
Howard Duff  1/23
Julia Duffy  
Patrick Duffy  3/1
Patty Duke  2/12
Nancy Dussault  5/5
Herb Edelman  
Samantha Eggar  3/9
Nicole Eggert
Stephen Elliott 3/10, 3/11, 5/7
Ron Ely  1/4
Chad Everett  5/2
Greg Evigan  4/5
Joel Fabiani
Nanette Fabray  1/1, 3/18
Morgan Fairchild  1/1
Lola Falana  3/22
Stephanie Faracy  4/17
Alan Feinstein  3/20
José Ferrer  1/16
Mel Ferrer  3/8
Miguel Ferrer
Gail Fisher
Fern Fitzgerald
Joan Fontaine  3/18
Bette Ford  3/7
Steve Forrest  1/18
Robert Forster  4/15
Kimberly Foster
Bernard Fox
Jonathan Frakes
Anthony Franciosa  4/8
Genie Francis  2/5, 4/18
Melissa Francis
Charles Frank  2/5, 3/23
Gary Frank  1/22
Steve Franken
Mary Frann  2/2, 3/1
Eva Gabor  1/21
Boyd Gaines  1/18, 4/6
Don Galloway  1/21
Teresa Ganzel  2/4
Beverly Garland  2/12
George Gaynes  3/12
Anthony Geary  3/5
Judy Geeson
Susan George  3/21
Estelle Getty  2/1
Jack Gilford  1/1
Richard Gilliland  
Hermione Gingold  1/4
Justin Gocke
Grant Goodeve  4/3
Marjoe Gortner
Walter Gotell  2/1
Stewart Granger  1/2, 4/19
Karen Grassle  1/12
Erin Gray   3/15
Andy Griffith
Scott Grimes
David Groh
Harry Guardino  4/3
Robert Guillaume  4/10
Moses Gunn  3/24
Molly Hagan  4/22
Albert Hague  1/11, 5/10
Deidre Hall  2/4
Dorian Harewood
Pat Harrington Jr.  3/17
Jenilee Harrison  4/17
Marilyn Hassett  1/20
Richard Hatch  1/2, 3/9, 4/19
Lloyd Haynes
David Hedison  4/11
Tippi Hedren  5/12
Alex Henteloff
Lynn Herring
Jon-Erik Hexum  1/15
Martin Hewitt  1/12
Alice Hirson
Earl Holliman  3/24
Robert Hooks  1/3, 5/17
Bo Hopkins  1/20
James Houghton  1/10, 2/6
Ken Howard  1/16, 3/1
Gary Hudson  
Barnard Hughes   1/16
Engelbert Humperdinck  1/20
Leann Hunley   4/1
Barry Ingham
Vincent Irizarry  5/6
Bianca Jagger  3/24
Art James
Dawn Jeffory  1/8
Anne Jeffreys  1/15
Barry Jenner
Arte Johnson  1/11
Laura Johnson
Michelle Johnson  2/2
Renée Jones
Shirley Jones  1/1, 4/12
Louis Jourdan  1/21
Elaine Joyce  1/9
Steve Kanaly  1/17, 2/11
Dianne Kay  1/11
Caren Kaye  5/13
Lainie Kazan  1/1, 5/6
Stacey Keach  1/16
Charles Keating
Steven Keats  1/20
Virginia Keehne  3/16
Sally Kellerman  1/23
Ken Kercheval  1/7, 3/12
Lance Kerwin  1/17
Wendy Kilbourne  3/22
Richard Kiley   2/10
Dana Kimmell
Richard Kline 2/22
Patricia Klous  1/10
Pete Kowanko  2/7
Terence Knox 2/22
Jack Kruschen  3/23
Mimi Kuzyk  3/7
Matthew Laborteaux  5/12
Carlos Lacámara
Margaret Ladd  4/15
Lorenzo Lamas  1/11
Martin Landau  1/8
Audrey Landers  3/10
Hope Lange  1/6, 4/7
Heather Langenkamp  5/7
Robert Lansing  3/13
Louise Latham  4/4
Piper Laurie
Carol Lawrence  2/9
George Lazenby  1/15
Robin Leach  4/19
Sabrina LeBeauf  4/10
Christian LeBlanc
Ruta Lee  2/7
Frederic Leehne  5/16
Kay Lenz  1/14, 5/4
Terry Lester  3/7
Liberace  1/11
Gordon Lightfoot  5/12
Viveca Lindfors   3/1
June Lockhart  3/16
Heather Locklear  1/3
Gary Lockwood  5/2
Claudia Lonow  4/13
Gloria Loring
Laurence Luckinbill  4/20
Carol Lynley  1/9
Gavin MacLeod  2/9
Stephen Macht  4/4
Patrick Macnee
Bill Macy  1/1
Robert Mandan  4/21
Larry Manetti  2/2
Monte Markham  1/13, 4/19
Peter Marshall  1/13
Barney Martin
Jared Martin  2/9, 4/7
John H. Martin
Gregg Marx
Tom Mason  5/4
Deborah May
Rod McCary  1/19, 3/23
Kevin McCarthy  3/5
Constance McCashin  1/13
Leigh McCloskey  1/5, 3/12
John McCook  1/14
Patty McCormack  1/18
Roddy McDowall  2/1
Mary Kate McGeehan  4/4
Ted McGinley  3/19, 5/7
Dorothy McGuire
John McIntire  1/7
Philip McKeon
Audrey Meadows  3/4
Jayne Meadows
Lee Meriwether  3/9
Dina Merrill  1/18, 4/1, 4/2
Art Metrano  2/4
Vera Miles  1/18, 2/12, 3/3, 4/22
Nolan Miller
John Mills  3/22
Juliet Mills  2/9, 4/11
Brian Stokes Mitchell
Mary Ann Mobley  2/7
Melba Moore
Erin Moran  1/1
Michael Moriarty   3/17
Phil Morris
William R. Moses  4/13
Kate Mulgrew  5/3
Edward Mulhare  4/22
Ben Murphy  2/3
Timothy Patrick Murphy  1/15, 2/8
Don Murray  4/14
Ed Nelson  5/5
Tracy Nelson  1/2
Lois Nettleton  
Haing S. Ngor  3/17
Denise Nicholas
Leslie Nielsen
Jeanette Nolan  1/7
Maidie Norman  1/8
Christopher Norris 1/4, 4/17, 5/15
Wayne Northrop  3/8, 5/8
Danny Nucci
Margaret O'Brien  1/11
Donald O'Connor  1/11
Ken Olandt  4/16
Ken Olin  4/17
Patrick O'Neal
Dick O'Neill  2/22, 5/15
David Opatoshu
Alan Oppenheimer
Eleanor Parker  1/11
Sarah Jessica Parker  3/21
Barbara Parkins  1/9
Julie Parrish   3/14
Lorna Patterson  5/7
Neva Patterson  4/5
Lisa Pelikan  4/3
Thaao Penghlis  2/10
John Bennett Perry  3/18
Nehemiah Persoff
Donna Pescow  1/6, 5/10
Roberta Peters 4/9
Joanna Pettet  1/14
Michelle Phillips  1/5, 3/20, 4/2, 4/3, 4/4, 4/5, 4/6
River Phoenix  2/4
Robert Pine  1/12
Don Porter  1/9
Markie Post  1/21
Tom Poston   3/4
Cliff Potts  2/6, 4/22, 5/9
Lawrence Pressman  3/15
Lindsay Price 
Marc Price  4/16
Barry Primus
Jonathan Prince  3/17
Cristina Raines  1/13, 4/20
Dack Rambo  1/5, 5/1
Lynn Redgrave   1/6, 4/9
Robert Reed  1/5, 2/4, 4/9
Shanna Reed  
Duncan Regehr  3/10, 3/11
Dee Dee Rescher
Alejandro Rey  1/1
Debbie Reynolds  3/23
Peter Mark Richman  5/12
Debi Richter  3/1
DeAnne Robbins  1/9
Pernell Roberts   1/1
Tony Roberts
Charlie Robinson  3/20
Chris Robinson  4/8
Alex Rocco  5/6
Eugene Roche  4/4, 5/10
Ginger Rogers  5/1
Tristan Rogers  4/1
Jamie Rose  5/14
Margot Rose
Arthur Rosenberg  3/16
Marion Ross  3/2
John Rubinstein  5/17
Barbara Rush   3/12
Mitchell Ryan  1/23
Michael Sabatino 3/2
Emma Samms  1/15
Casey Sander
Debra Sandlund
Doug Savant
John Saxon  5/9
William Schallert  3/25
Emily Schulman
Tracy Scoggins  5/3
Peter Scolari  3/10
Geoffrey Scott  2/6
Martha Scott   5/7
Melody Thomas Scott
Ted Shackelford  1/23, 5/1
Madeleine Sherwood  4/7
Dinah Shore  4/21
Charles Siebert  3/15, 5/5
Cynthia Sikes  3/3
Jean Simmons  1/10
Marc Singer  4/21
James Sloyan
Martha Smith  4/4
Shelley Smith  2/6
Jan Smithers  1/20, 3/19
Tom Smothers  1/17
Michael Spound  5/11
Tori Spelling  1/12, 3/9, 4/18
Robert Stack  1/18, 2/12
James Stacy  3/6
John Standing  4/13
Mary Stavin
Helen Stenborg  1/16
James Stephens  5/14
Robert Sterling  1/15
Andrew Stevens  4/18
Connie Stevens   1/3
Craig Stevens  1/11, 3/4
Morgan Stevens  2/8, 4/14
Naomi Stevens
Stella Stevens  2/2
McLean Stevenson  1/14
Parker Stevenson  1/8
Catherine Mary Stewart  2/10
Dee Wallace Stone  3/15
Edson Stroll
Brenda Strong
Don Stroud  3/10, 3/11
Barbara Stuart
Lynn Swann 2/22
Inga Swenson  5/13
Cary-Hiroyuki Tagawa
Vic Tayback   1/6
Elizabeth Taylor   2/1
Josh Taylor  5/8
Leigh Taylor-Young  1/5, 4/8
Lauren Tewes  2/2, 4/9
Roy Thinnes  1/19
Charlene Tilton  1/6
Berlinda Tolbert
Mel Torme   1/1
Leslie Uggams  4/12
Kim Johnston Ulrich
Karen Valentine  4/20
Granville Van Dusen  2/4, 5/14
Merete Van Kamp  5/16, 5/17
Dick Van Patten  1/4, 3/1
Deborah Van Valkenburgh
Robert Vaughn  1/4
Gwen Verdon  4/20
Kate Vernon  4/5, 3/5
Jan-Michael Vincent  4/6
Kristina Wagner
Garry Walberg
Robert Walden  5/17
Susan Walden
Dee Wallace  2/1, 5/6
Jessica Walter  3/14
Sela Ward  4/5
Jennifer Warren  4/14
Carl Weintraub   5/15
Carry Wells  1/5
Betty White  2/5 
Stuart Whitman  4/21
Larry Wilcox  1/19, 2/7
Lisa Wilcox
Paul Winfield  2/8
Edward Winter
Shelley Winters  1/22
Iggie Wolfington  1/12
Karen Woncemore  1/14
Jane Wyatt  1/12, 6/7
Sharon Wyatt  2/9
Jeff Yagher  4/7
Claire Yarlett  5/5
Cassie Yates  1/19, 5/9
Efrem Zimbalist Jr.  2/2, 4/1-4/7, 5/14
Adrian Zmed  3/10, 5/8

Episodes

Pilot (1983)

Season 1 (1983–84)

Season 2 (1984–85)

Season 3 (1985–86)

Season 4 (1986–87)

Season 5 (1987–88)

Soundtrack 
The theme music used for the opening titles was composed by Henry Mancini, who composed famous songs such as "Moon River", "Charade" and "Days of Wine and Roses".

Home media
On July 21, 2009, Paramount Home Entertainment and CBS DVD released Season 1 of Arthur Hailey's Hotel on DVD in Region 1. The episodes are uncut, with most of them clocking in at over 48 minutes, and some coming in at just a shade under that.

On October 20, 2015, Visual Entertainment released Hotel – The Complete Collection on DVD in Region 1 for the first time in a 29-disc box set.

On December 6, 2016, VEI re-released the complete series in a condensed, 20-disc edition. The discs were all compiled in a single, jumbo DVD case (the original complete series edition was released with each individual season contained in five individual DVD cases). The box claims the discs to be Region 1 protected but Seasons 1, 2 and 3 are actually region-free.

Remake

In 2003, Aaron Spelling tried to remake the show, twenty years after the original's premiere. The pilot, which starred Michael Jai White and Christina Vidal, was shot for UPN, who passed on the show.

References

External links

Hotel DVD review and production history of series

1983 American television series debuts
1988 American television series endings
1980s American drama television series
American Broadcasting Company original programming
American television soap operas
American primetime television soap operas
Television series by CBS Studios
Television series by Spelling Television
Television shows based on British novels
Television shows based on Canadian novels
Television shows set in San Francisco
English-language television shows
Adaptations of works by Arthur Hailey
Television series set in hotels